Lichfield and Tamworth was a parliamentary constituency centred on the towns of Lichfield and Tamworth in Staffordshire.  It returned one Member of Parliament (MP) to the House of Commons of the Parliament of the United Kingdom, elected by the first past the post system.

History

The constituency was created for the 1950 general election, and abolished for the 1983 general election, when it was partly replaced by the new Mid Staffordshire constituency.

Boundaries 
1950–1955: The Boroughs of Lichfield and Tamworth, the Urban Districts of Aldridge and Rugeley, and the Rural District of Lichfield.

1955–1974: The Boroughs of Lichfield and Tamworth, the Urban District of Rugeley, and the Rural District of Lichfield.

1974–1983: The Boroughs of Lichfield and Tamworth, and the Rural District of Lichfield except the parish of Brindley Heath.

Members of Parliament

Elections

Elections in the 1950s

Elections in the 1960s

Elections in the 1970s

References 

Parliamentary constituencies in Staffordshire (historic)
Constituencies of the Parliament of the United Kingdom established in 1950
Constituencies of the Parliament of the United Kingdom disestablished in 1983